The Kenton County School District (the definite article is part of the district's official name) is a local education agency headquartered in Ft. Wright, Kentucky and is the public school system for Kenton County outside of those cities who have Independent School Districts.

History

Education Prior to establishment 
Kenton County was created in 1804 as Kentucky's 90th county. It was named after pioneer, Simon Kenton. The first free public school in Kenton County was in Covington was established in 1820. A second cabin school was open up in 1836 on Gerard Street.

In 1921, the district bought its first school bus.

Schools
The district operates 18 schools: 11 elementary schools, 4 middle schools, and 3 high schools. The district is responsible for 14,000+ student or approximately 36% of the under age 18 population in the county. However, a large portion of the county's population lives in one of the county's four independent school districts:
The largest city in the Northern Kentucky region, Covington's, northern urban core is served by Covington Independent Public Schools but its southern suburban neighborhoods are assigned to Kenton County District schools.
The cities of Erlanger and Elsmere are served by Erlanger-Elsmere Schools, except portions of Erlanger City Limits that lie East of Turkey Foot Road.
The city of Fort Mitchell is served by the Beechwood Independent School District.
The city of Ludlow is served by the Ludlow Independent Schools.

High schools

Middle schools

Elementary schools

References

External links
Kenton County School District Site

School districts in Kentucky
Education in Kenton County, Kentucky
School districts established in 1884
1884 establishments in Kentucky